Philip Elzer Gade Larsen (born 7 December 1989) is a Danish professional ice hockey defenceman. He is currently playing with Esbjerg Energy of the Metal Ligaen (DEN). He was originally drafted 149th overall by the Dallas Stars in the 2008 NHL Entry Draft.

Playing career
Larsen came to Rögle BK's junior team at age 15. On 9 October 2005, Larsen made his senior hockey debut for Rögle in a 3–0 win over Nybro Vikings. For the 2006–07 season Larsen was acquired by Frölunda HC. On 24 February 2007, Larsen made his Elitserien debut for Frölunda in an 8–2 win against HV71. On 20 April 2009, following his season at Frölunda, Larsen was recalled to the NHL club that drafted him, the Dallas Stars, who then signed him to a three-year entry-level contract.

On 21 January 2012, he scored his first NHL goal against Josh Harding of the Minnesota Wild in a 5–2 defeat.

With the 2012–13 season delayed due to the Lockout, Larsen signed a contract for the duration of the dispute with Lukko of the Finnish SM-liiga on 27 September 2012.

After completion of the lockout-shortened 2012–13 season, on 4 July 2013, Larsen was traded, along with a draft pick, by the Stars to the Edmonton Oilers in exchange for Shawn Horcoff.

On 28 May 2014, HC Yugra of the KHL signed Larsen to a one-year contract. Larsen enjoyed a successful debut season in the KHL in 2014–15, contributing with 6 goals and 25 points in 56 games as Yugra missed the post-season.

On 25 May 2015, Larsen signed a one-year contract to remain in the KHL, moving to Finnish participant Jokerit. While in the playoffs with Jokerit having recorded 36 points in 52 regular season games, on 24 February 2016, Larsen's NHL rights were traded by the Edmonton Oilers to the Vancouver Canucks in exchange for a conditional 5th round pick in the 2017 draft.

On 1 July 2016 Larsen signed a one-year, one-way deal by the Vancouver Canucks. Limited to 26 games with the Canucks due to injury and form, Larsen struggled to make an impact in his return to the NHL in 2016–17, registering 1 goal and 6 points.

As an impending free agent from the Canucks, Larsen opted to return to the KHL after his rights were traded by Jokerit, agreeing to a two-year contract with Russian club, Salavat Yulaev Ufa on 20 April 2017.

After the 2022 Russian invasion of Ukraine, he elected to leave the team.

International play
At international level, Larsen has represented Denmark at the 2008 World Junior Ice Hockey Championships, and at the 2009, 2010, 2012, 2013, and 2014 IIHF World Championships with the Denmark men's national ice hockey team.

Career statistics

Regular season and playoffs

International

References

External links
 
 Official website of Philip Larsen

1989 births
Living people
Borås HC players
Dallas Stars draft picks
Dallas Stars players
Danish ice hockey defencemen
Edmonton Oilers players
Frölunda HC players
Jokerit players
Lukko players
Oklahoma City Barons players
People from Esbjerg
Rögle BK players
Salavat Yulaev Ufa players
Texas Stars players
HC Yugra players
Vancouver Canucks players
Sportspeople from the Region of Southern Denmark